Veli-Matti Lindström (born 15 November 1983) is a Finnish former ski jumper. His career best achievement was a silver medal at the 2002 Winter Olympics in Salt Lake City in the team large hill event. He also won a silver medal in the team event at the 2004 Ski Flying World Championships in Planica, as well as two championships at the Ski Flying World Cup in Planica in the team event in 2002 and 2003.

On 21 March 2003 in Planica, Lindström became the first ski jumper in history to surpass the 230 metre mark, with a jump of 232.5 m. However, his jump was rendered an invalid world record due to him touching the snow with his hand.

Invalid ski jumping world record

 Not recognized! Ground touch at world record distance.

References

External links
 
 

1983 births
Living people
People from Nastola
Finnish male ski jumpers
Olympic ski jumpers of Finland
Ski jumpers at the 2002 Winter Olympics
Olympic medalists in ski jumping
Medalists at the 2002 Winter Olympics
Olympic silver medalists for Finland
Sportspeople from Päijät-Häme
21st-century Finnish people